Lara St. John  (born April 15, 1971) is a Canadian violinist.

Early life
Lara St. John was born in London, Ontario, and spent her early childhood there. As the daughter of two educators (her father was a language teacher and her mother a music instructor), she and her older brother Scott were encouraged at an early age to develop musical talents.

St. John began playing the violin at the age of two and the following year she began her first lessons with the instructor Richard Lawrence. She gave her first public performance as soloist with an orchestra by age four.

In 1976, at the age of five, she began making frequent trips with her mother and brother to Cleveland, Ohio, where the young St. John worked under the instruction of Linda Cerone. In 1979, she spent a year in Paris studying with Gérard Jarry. In 1980, at the age of 9, she won grand prize at the Canadian Music Competition.

At age 10, St. John made her European debut with the Gulbenkian Orchestra in Lisbon, after which she spent three years touring the continent, including Spain, France, and Hungary.

Accepted at the age of thirteen, St. John entered the Curtis Institute of Music in Philadelphia, where she later received her degree. She studied under Felix Galimir and Arnold Steinhardt.

St. John has stated that, during her studies at the Curtis Institute of Music, she was sexually assaulted by one of her instructors, Jascha Brodsky, when she was 14 years old. An investigation by the law firm Cozen O'Connor, commissioned by the Curtis Board, found St.John's claims to be credible.The Board unanimously accepted the law firm's report.

In 1985, St. John participated in the Yehudi Menuhin International Competition for Young Violinists, winning 4th price in the Junior division.

In 1988, when she was sixteen, she moved on her own to the former Soviet Union, becoming the youngest post-graduate student at the Moscow Conservatory. In that same year, St. John traveled throughout the Soviet Union and Eastern Europe, where she encountered the Romani people, a cultural experience that would later influence her musical performance projects.

St. John eventually returned to her studies and attended three different academies: the Guildhall School in London (under David Takeno), Mannes College of Music in New York (under Felix Galimir), and the New England Conservatory (NEC) in Boston (under James Buswell).

Career

Notable performances
In North America, St. John has performed as a soloist with major symphony orchestras that include those of Cleveland, Philadelphia, Minnesota, Seattle, San Francisco, Toronto, Montreal, Vancouver, the Boston Pops, the Knights, the National Arts Centre Orchestra (Ottawa) and the National Symphony Orchestra (Mexico).

In South America, she has performed with the National Symphony Orchestra (Peru), the Buenos Aires Philharmonic, the Orquestra Sinfônica do Estado de São Paulo and the Orquestra Sinfônica Brasileira.

In Europe, her performances have been with the Royal Philharmonic Orchestra, Bournemouth Symphony Orchestra, Ensemble Orchestral de Paris, Marseilles Opera Orchestra, Orchestre philharmonique de Strasbourg, Amsterdam Symphony Orchestra, NDR Radiophilharmonie (Hanover), Mendelssohn Kammerorchester (Leipzig), RAI National Symphony Orchestra (Turin), Orchestra della Fondazione Teatro Lirico Giuseppe Verdi (Trieste), Zurich Chamber Orchestra, Norrköping Symphony Orchestra (Sweden), Oulu Symphony Orchestra (Finland), Kymenlaakson Orkesteri (Finland), Franz Liszt Chamber Orchestra (Budapest), Hungarian National Philharmonic, Belgrade Philharmonic Orchestra and Akbank Chamber Orchestra (Istanbul).

In Asia, she has made solo appearances with the China Philharmonic Orchestra (Beijing), Shanghai Symphony Orchestra, Hong Kong Philharmonic, Guangzhou Symphony Orchestra, Hangzhou Philharmonic Orchestra, Kazakh State Symphony Orchestra and Tokyo Symphony Orchestra, among others. St. John has also performed with the Queensland Orchestra, Adelaide Symphony Orchestra and Australian Chamber Orchestra in Australia, as well as the Auckland Philharmonia and Southern Symphonia in New Zealand.

In 2012, she produced and performed in the 25th anniversary concert of Astor Piazzolla’s "Four Seasons of Buenos Aires" in New York's Central Park.

Groups
From 2002 to 2007, St. John performed with the Canadian music ensemble Bowfire.

Instruments
In 1997, upon winning the Canada Council Stradivarius Prize, St. John was given the two-year use of a Lyall Stradivarius built in 1702. In 1999, an anonymous donor made a permanent loan to St. John of the 1779 "Salabue" Guadagnini.

Ancalagon Records
In 1999, St. John founded the artist-owned record company, Ancalagon LLC. She formed the company as a result of her personal dissatisfaction with the marketing and production approach of larger recording companies. St. John named the record company after her pet iguana, Ancalagon.

Internet presence
St. John's recordings have been popular on iTunes. Her Bach: The Six Sonatas and Partitas for Violin Solo was iTunes' best-selling double album of 2007. Her previous recording, Bach: The Concerto Album, rose to number one in the iTunes' classical category in 2005, shortly after appearing in the "strongly recommended" section of Gramophone. Apolkalypse Now, featuring St. John as a member of the group Polkastra, was released on iTunes in July 2009.

Music videos
St. John frequently produces and edits her own music videos, many of which are made available on YouTube. These include four videos of tracks from her "Shiksa" album. She has also participated in a video project series with dancer Stephanie Cadman, evoking the parallels between folk dancing and the dance movements of JS Bach.

Recognition, notable reviews and awards

St. John's work has been featured on NPR's All Things Considered, CNN's Showbiz Today, Fox News, the CBC, and the Bravo! special series, Live At the Rehearsal Hall. Three short films have been produced by Bravo! featuring St. John, High Wire Bach, Czardas Caprice and High Flying Bach. She has also appeared in People Magazine.

At the 2008 Beijing Olympics, gold medalist Nastia Liukin performed her floor routine to "Variations on Dark Eyes (Occhi Chornye)", from St. John's Gypsy album.

St. John's work has been reviewed by publications including The New York Times, the Los Angeles Times and U.S. News & World Report.

Winner 2011 Juno Classical Album of the Year – Large Ensemble or Soloist(s) with Large Ensemble Accompaniment

In 2018 she served as artistic curator for Wolf Trap Chamber Music at the Barns.

At the time of its release, St. John received attention for her then-controversial photo on the cover of her debut album, Bach Works for Violin Solo (1996). The photo showed her from the waist up, apparently topless, holding a violin positioned to hide her chest. The album sold over 25,000 copies, a best seller by the standards of the classical music industry.

Personal life
While not on tour, St. John resides in New York City.

She feels an affinity with reptiles: she has a five-foot-long pet iguana, Ancalagon, named after a dragon from J.R.R. Tolkien's Silmarillion.

Her native languages are English and French; she is fluent in Spanish and Russian as well.

Discography
 1996 – Bach Works for Violin Solo, released by Well Tempered Productions
 1997 – Gypsy, released by Well Tempered Productions
 2002 – Bach: The Concerto Album, released by Ancalagon Records
 2003 – Re: Bach, released by Sony Classical
 2007 – Bach: The Six Sonatas & Partitas for Violin Solo, released by Ancalagon Records
 2008 – Hindson: Violin Concerto; Corigliano: Suite from The Red Violin; Liszt/Martin Kennedy/St. John: Totentanz released by Ancalagon Records
 2009 – Vivaldi: The Four Seasons / Piazzolla: The Four Seasons of Buenos Aires released by Ancalagon Records
 2010 – Mozart: Scott & Lara St. John / The Knights released by Ancalagon Records Winner 2011 Juno Classical Album of the Year – Large Ensemble or Soloist(s) with Large Ensemble Accompaniment
 2012 – Bach Sonatas: Lara St. John, Violin & Marie-Pierre Langlamet, Harp released by Ancalagon Records
 2013 – Bach: The Violin Concertos, released by Ancalagon Records
 2014 – Schubert, released by Ancalagon Records
 2015 – Shiksa, released by Ancalagon Records
 2019 (in development) – Key of A - Beethoven Sonata No. 9, Opus 47 "Kreutzer", and Franck Sonata in A major, with Matt Herskowitz, Piano, to be released by Ancalagon Records

References

External links
 
 YouTube channel
 page on management company website
 
 Bach Works for Violin Solo at jsbach.net

1971 births
Living people
Canadian classical violinists
Canadian people of Scottish descent
Magnatune artists
Musicians from London, Ontario
Juno Award for Classical Album of the Year – Large Ensemble or Soloist(s) with Large Ensemble Accompaniment winners
21st-century classical violinists
Women classical violinists
Members of the Order of Canada
Canadian emigrants to the United States
Musicians from New York City
20th-century classical violinists
20th-century Canadian violinists and fiddlers
21st-century Canadian violinists and fiddlers
20th-century Canadian women musicians
21st-century Canadian women musicians